Youssouf Kanté (born August 13, 1984, Paris) is a French footballer who recently played for Baulmes.

Career

Europe
Kanté began playing soccer in the youth academy of the esteemed French club Paris Saint-Germain. When he turned nineteen, he signed with ADO Den Haag of the Dutch Second Division. In 2006 when he signed with Swiss club Windisch, and then moved to Romania and was offered a mid season contract by Astra Ploieşti. Upon completion of the season, Kanté was offered a trial by Câmpina, however, chose to play in the United States instead.

North America
After unsuccessful trials with Major League Soccer teams Kansas City Wizards and Toronto in early 2008, Kanté signed with the Seattle Sounders  on April 24, 2008.

Following the USL Sounders' demise (as a result of Seattle Sounders FC joining Major League Soccer), Kanté signed with Minnesota Thunder on 17 February 2009.

References

External links
 Minnesota Thunder bio
 Seattle Sounders bio

1984 births
Living people
French footballers
Footballers from Paris
Paris Saint-Germain F.C. players
ADO Den Haag players
FC Astra Giurgiu players
Seattle Sounders (1994–2008) players
Minnesota Thunder players
USL First Division players
FCM Câmpina players
FK Senica players
Slovak Super Liga players
Expatriate footballers in Slovakia
French expatriate sportspeople in Slovakia
Expatriate footballers in the Netherlands
French expatriate sportspeople in the Netherlands
Expatriate footballers in Romania
French expatriate sportspeople in Romania
Expatriate soccer players in the United States
French expatriate sportspeople in the United States
Association football forwards